Heaven and Earth is a studio album by Al Jarreau. It was produced by Narada Michael Walden and Louis Biancaniello. The album won Jarreau the Grammy Award for Best R&B Vocal Performance, Male in 1993. Essentially a collection of R&B songs produced with the artist's jazz and pop sensibilities in mind, Heaven and Earth contains a two-part cover of the Miles Davis tune "Blue in Green", from Davis's Kind of Blue, that demonstrates Jarreau's considerable prowess as a vocal interpreter and scat singer.

Track listing
 "What You Do to Me" – 4:35 (Larry Batiste, Louis Biancaniello, Claytoven Richardson, Narada Michael Walden)
 "It's Not Hard to Love You" – 6:11 (Sally Jo Dakota, Skyler Jett, Kevin Walden, Narada Michael Walden)
 "Blue Angel" – 5:08 (Jett, Jennifer Miro, Narada Michael Walden)
 "Heaven and Earth" – 4:27 (Louis Biancaniello, Linda Biancaniello)
 "Superfine Love" – 5:24 (Louis Biancaniello, Jeffrey Cohen, Narada Michael Walden)
 "Whenever I Hear Your Name" – 5:28 (Cohen, Walden)
 "Love of My Life" – 4:01 (Jarreau, Jett, Miro, Walden)
 "If I Break" – 5:47 (Jarreau, Mike Mani, Walden)
 "(Blue in Green) Tapestry; The Dedication" – 2:53 (Miles Davis, Jarreau)
 "(Blue in Green) Tapestry; The Dance" – 3:27 (Davis, Jarreau)

Personnel 
 Al Jarreau – lead vocals, vocal arrangements (1), backing vocals (5, 6, 8), vocal percussion (10)
 Louis "King Pin" Biancaniello – keyboards (1-4, 7), synthesizers (1, 2, 4, 7), programming (1, 2, 4, 7), horn arrangements (1), Moog bass (2-5), Fairlight CMI (3), Hammond B3 organ (3), synth horns (3), additional sampling (3), synthesizer arrangements (3), synth solo (4), Fairlight bass (4), additional keyboards (8), additional programming (8)
 Frank "Killer Bee" Martin – acoustic piano (5, 9, 10), acoustic piano solo (5), synthesizer arrangements (5), keyboards (6), synthesizers (6), flute (6), rhythm arrangements (6), string arrangements (6, 8, 9, 10), conductor (8, 9, 10)
 Narada Michael Walden – drums, rhythm arrangements (1-9), synthesizers (5), sequencing (5), tambourine (5)
 Mike Mani – keyboards (8), programming (8), Fairlight sequencing ("spooky elements") (8), synthesizer arrangements (8)
 Vernon "Ice" Black – guitar (1)
 Corrado Rustici – slide guitar (5)
 Myron Dove – electric bass (1)
 Joel Smith – electric bass (2, 7, 10)
 Jeff Chambers – acoustic bass (9)
 Marquinho Brazil – maracas (5)
 Dan Higgins – saxophones (1)
 Jerry Hey – trumpet (1)
 Robbie Kwock – trumpet (5)
 Paul McCandless – oboe (8)
 Kitty Beethoven – backing vocals (1, 2)
 Nikita Germaine – backing vocals (1, 7)
 Sandy Griffith – backing vocals (1, 2, 7), spoken part (2)
 Skyler Jett – backing vocals (1-3, 7, 8)
 Claytoven Richardson – backing vocals (1-4, 7, 8), vocal arrangements (1)
 Chris Hawkins – backing vocals (2)
 Raz Kennedy – backing vocals (3)
 Tony Lindsay – backing vocals (4, 6, 8)
 Jeanie Tracy – backing vocals (4)
 Rebecca West – backing vocals (4)
 Boni Boyer – lead backing vocals (7)

Production 
 Producer – Narada Michael Walden
 Co-Producers – Louis Biancaniello (Tracks #1 & 4) and Frank Martin (Tracks #9 & 10).
 Associate Producer (Track #6) – Frank Martin
 Engineered and Mixed by David Frazer at Tarpan Studios (San Rafael, CA).
 Assistant Engineer – Jeff Gray
 Additional Engineering – Marc Reyburn
 Production Coordination – Janice Lee and Kelly McRae
 Project Coordinatior – Robby Scharf
 Art Direction and Design – Deborah Norcross
 Photography – Merlyn Rosenberg

References

Al Jarreau albums
1992 albums
Albums produced by Narada Michael Walden
Warner Records albums